Will Cotton (born 1965 in Melrose, Massachusetts, U.S.) is an American painter. His work primarily features landscapes composed of sweets, often inhabited by human subjects.  Will Cotton lives and works in New York City.

Work
 
Cotton's works from the 1990s depicted pop icons sourced from contemporary advertisements such as the Nestlé Quick bunny - directly referencing visual modes aimed at evoking desire.  Cotton described his early works in a 2008 interview, saying "My initial impulse to make these paintings really came out of an awareness of the commercial consumer landscape that we live in.  Every day we're bombarded with hundreds, if not thousands of messages designed specifically to incite desire within us."

In 1996, Cotton began to develop an iconography in which the landscape itself became an object of desire.  The paintings often feature scenery made up entirely of pastries, candy and melting ice cream.  He creates elaborate maquettes of these settings from real baked goods made in his Manhattan studio as a visual source for the final works. Since about 2002, nude or nearly nude pinup-style models have occasionally populated these candy-land scenes. As in the past, the works project a tactile indulgence in fanciful glut. The female characters are icons of indulgence and languor, reflecting the feel of the landscape itself. "These paintings are all about a very specific place," says Cotton, "It's a utopia where all desire is fulfilled all the time, meaning ultimately that there can be no desire, as there is no desire without lack."

Influences
 
Interested in cultural iconography, Cotton's art makes use of the common language of consumer culture shared across geographical boundaries. He considers the visual threads in his work, drawn from imagery ranging from the Candy Land board game and gingerbread houses to pinup art and cotton candy, to be part of the popular culture lexicon. Cotton’s work also builds upon and updates the idea of land of milk and honey in European literature and art. Cotton states “The dream of paradise, of a land of plenty, is a thread that runs through all of human history, not just in the affluent times but in fact very often in the lean as well.” He has also been inspired by painters Frederic Edwin Church, François Boucher and Fragonard, the photographer Carleton Watkins, as well as  pin-up painters such as Gil Elvgren.  Of his landscape painting influences, Cotton says,

I was initially drawn to the Hudson River School when I learned that many of the paintings were made specifically to incite a feeling of awe and a desire to experience the new frontier. This struck me as a particularly American kind of propagandist message that I wanted to reference in my paintings. I love the idea of showing ... what it might be like to experience such a place.
 —Will Cotton

Career

Will Cotton has exhibited throughout the United States and Europe. He was represented by Mary Boone Gallery, New York, from 2000 until the gallery's closure in 2019. He is currently represented by Baldwin Gallery, Aspen, Colorado; Michael Kohn Gallery, Los Angeles; Galerie Daniel Templon, Paris, France, and Jablonka Galerie, Cologne, Germany. His works have also been exhibited at the San Francisco Museum of Modern Art (2000); the Seattle Art Museum (2002), the Kunsthalle Bielefeld, Germany (2004); the Hudson River Museum (2007); the Triennale di Milano, Italy (2007) the Musée Marmottan Monet, Paris (2008), the Orlando Museum of Art, and the Museo Nacional de Bellas Artes, Havana.

His work is in the collections of the Seattle Art Museum, Washington, the Smithsonian American Art Museum and the Columbus Museum of Art, Ohio.

In 2004 he received the Princess Grace Foundation award for contemporary art in Monaco. Will Cotton was awarded an honorary Doctorate from the New York Academy of Art where he was a senior critic in 2012.

Other projects
Cotton installed a pop-up (model) French bakery art installation at Partners & Spade in Manhattan, New York.  Confections and baked goods the artist used for visual reference were baked on site and were for sale over three weekends in November 2009.  Bakery staff were fitted with custom-made tiaras of the kind Cotton paints atop the heads of many women in his paintings.

Cotton was the Artistic Director for Katy Perry's 2010 music video, California Gurls, which was based on themes and imagery from his paintings.

In his debut performance art work, Cockaigne for Performa 11, Cotton employed the forms of both ballet and burlesque to create a celebration of whipped cream and cotton candy.

References

External links
 Official website
 Corwin, William, Will Cotton Cockaigne, 2011, Brooklyn Rail, review.

Living people
20th-century American painters
American male painters
21st-century American painters
1965 births
People from Melrose, Massachusetts
Painters from Massachusetts
Cooper Union alumni
New York Academy of Art alumni
Album-cover and concert-poster artists